The Suzhou Museum of Opera and Theatre or China Kunqu Museum is a theatre museum in Suzhou, China. It is located in a Ming dynasty theatre of latticed wood and has display halls with old musical instruments, hand-copied books, lyrics and scores, masks and costumes. It also has other paraphernalia including a life size orchestra and photographs of performers. The museum also covers kunqu's 500-year-old history. The museum is often used for performances today and the teahouse stages daily shows.

References

Museums in Suzhou
Kunqu
Theatre museums in China